Runnymede Bridge is a motorway, A-road, pedestrian, and cycle bridge, built in the 1960s and 1980s and expanded in the 2000s, carrying the M25 and A30 across the River Thames near the uppermost end of the Staines upon Thames and Egham reach of the river.  It is oriented north–south and is southwest of Heathrow Airport.  It consists of Runnymede Bridge and New Runnymede Bridge; commonly referred to as one bridge.

It is one of three bridges which carry motorways across the Thames, the others being the M3 Chertsey Bridge and the M4 Thames Bridge, Maidenhead. (The Queen Elizabeth II Bridge at the Dartford Crossing is not classified as part of the M25.)

History

Runnymede Bridge

Runnymede Bridge is a multi-span arch bridge at the uppermost end of the Staines upon Thames and Egham Reach of the River Thames: above Penton Hook Lock and below Bell Weir Lock. It opened in 1961 to carry the A30's Staines Bypass. 

Designs for the bridge were completed by 1939 by Sir Edwin Lutyens in concert with consulting engineer H Fitzsimons. World War II intervened, delaying construction by 20 years; Lutyens having died in 1944, his colleague George Stewart served as consulting architect, adopting the 1939 design. The architectural treatment of the bridge was considered of great importance because of its proximity to Runnymede (the water-meadow) and the structure is finished with hand-made brick facings, white cement and Portland stone. Until the 2013 reconstruction of Walton Bridge, this was the first single-span bridge (i.e. without piers) over the Thames upstream, there being none in London or the estuary.

New Runnymede Bridge

New Runnymede Bridge, forming its eastern half, was designed by Ove Arup and Joanna Kennedy and built in 1978 to complement the earlier western half of the crossing, also simply named Runnymede Bridge. It is a single arch bridge of approximately the same form, but is made up of a series of parallel concrete frames: these allow light to penetrate upwards underneath and transfer loads vertically to avoid disturbing the foundations of the westerly bridge companion. In the first decade of the 21st century, the motorway bridge was widened to five lanes each way, becoming the widest in Britain. In addition, the A30 has two lanes each way, making a total of fourteen traffic lanes, and also has a pedestrian pavement on its eastern side.

See also
 Crossings of the River Thames

Notes and references
Notes 
  
References

Bridges across the River Thames
Bridges in Surrey